The Fire (Scotland) Act 2005 is an Act of the Scottish Parliament made to "make provision about fire and rescue authorities and joint fire and rescue boards; to restate and amend the law in relation to fire services; to make provision in relation to the functions of such authorities and boards in connection with certain events and situations other than fires; to make provision for implementing in part Council Directives 89/391/EEC, 89/654/EEC, 91/383/EEC, 94/33/EC, 98/24/EC and 99/92/EC; to make other provision in relation to fire safety in certain premises; and for connected purposes. "

The Bill for this Act was passed on 23 February 2005 and received Royal Assent on 1 April 2005

Repeals, etc.
Schedule 3 amended 25 other Acts of the Parliaments of the United Kingdom and Scotland.
Schedule 4 amended 12 other Acts, most significantly the Fire Services Act 1947 and the Fire Services Act 1959 but did not repeal any Act entirely.

References

External links

Acts of the Scottish Parliament 2005
Fire and rescue in Scotland